Dames Ahoy! is a 1930 American comedy film directed by William James Craft and starring Glenn Tryon, Otis Harlan and Gertrude Astor. Produced and distributed by Universal Pictures, it was also released in a silent version.

Synopsis
Three sailors on shore leave search for a blonde woman who conned one of them out of some money. The encounter a different woman in a dance hall and win a contest.

Cast
Glenn Tryon as Jimmy Chase
Helen Wright as Mabel McGuire
Otis Harlan as Bill Jones
Eddie Gribbon as Mac Dougal
Gertrude Astor as The Blonde
Alice Belcher as  Parson's Wife 
 Walter Brennan as Side Show Barker 
 Edmund Cobb as Marine 
 Andy Devine as 	Marine at Dance Contest 
 Robert Dudley as 	Parson 
 Franklyn Farnum as 	Master of Ceremonies 
 Jack Kirk as 	Sailor

References

External links

Australian daybill; lobby poster
accessible version of lobby poster

1930 films
Films directed by William James Craft
Universal Pictures films
1930 comedy films
American comedy films
American black-and-white films
1930s English-language films
1930s American films